District of Mitrovica (Kosovo/UNMIK)
Kosovska Mitrovica District (Serbia)

District name disambiguation pages